Chiasmia is a genus of moths in the family Geometridae. It was described by Jacob Hübner in 1823.

Species
Species of this genus include:

Chiasmia abnormata (Prout, 1917)
Chiasmia abyssinica Krüger, 2001
Chiasmia acutiapex Krüger, 2001
Chiasmia adelpha Krüger, 2001
Chiasmia aestimaria (Hübner, 1809) – tamarisk peacock
Chiasmia affinis (Warren, 1902)
Chiasmia albivia (Prout, 1915)
Chiasmia alternata (Warren, 1899)
Chiasmia amarata (Guenée, 1858)
Chiasmia ammodes (Prout, 1922)
Chiasmia androphoba Krüger, 2001
Chiasmia angolae (Bethune-Baker, 1913)
Chiasmia angolaria (Snellen, 1872)
Chiasmia anguifera (Prout, 1934)
Chiasmia arenosa (Butler, 1875)
Chiasmia assimilis (Warren, 1899)
Chiasmia ate (Prout, 1926)
Chiasmia aureobrunnea Krüger, 2001
Chiasmia austera (Prout, 1932)
Chiasmia avitusarioides (Herbulot, 1956)
Chiasmia baringensis Agassiz, 2009
Chiasmia boarmioides Krüger, 2001
Chiasmia bomfordi Krüger, 2001
Chiasmia brongusaria (Walker, 1860)
Chiasmia brunnescens Krüger, 2001
Chiasmia butaria (Swinhoe, 1904)
Chiasmia calvifrons (Prout, 1916)
Chiasmia cararia (Swinhoe, 1904)
Chiasmia castanea Krüger, 2001
Chiasmia clathrata (Linnaeus, 1758) – latticed heath 
Chiasmia collaxata (Herbulot, 1987)
Chiasmia confuscata (Warren, 1899)
Chiasmia contaminata (Warren, 1902)
Chiasmia conturbata (Warren, 1898)
Chiasmia coronoleucas (Prout, 1915)
Chiasmia costicommata (Prout, 1922)
Chiasmia costiguttata (Warren, 1899)
Chiasmia crassata (Warren, 1897)
Chiasmia crassilembaria (Mabille, 1880)
Chiasmia crumenata (D. S. Fletcher, 1963)
Chiasmia curvifascia (Warren, 1897)
Chiasmia curvilineata (Warren, 1899)
Chiasmia danmariae Krüger, 2001
Chiasmia deceptrix Krüger, 2001
Chiasmia defixaria (Walker, 1861)
Chiasmia deleta Krüger, 2001
Chiasmia dentilineata (Warren, 1899)
Chiasmia diarmodia (Prout, 1925)
Chiasmia dodoma Krüger, 2001
Chiasmia duplicilinea (Warren, 1897)
Chiasmia evansi Krüger, 2001
Chiasmia extrusilinea (Prout, 1925)
Chiasmia featheri (Prout, 1922)
Chiasmia feraliata (Guenée, 1858)
Chiasmia fidoniata (Guenee, 1858)
Chiasmia fitzgeraldi (Carcasson, 1964)
Chiasmia flavicuneata (Herbulot, 1987)
Chiasmia fontainei (D. S. Fletcher, 1963)
Chiasmia frontosa (Wiltshire, 1986)
Chiasmia fulvimargo (Warren, 1899)
Chiasmia fulvisparsa (Warren, 1897)
Chiasmia furcata (Warren, 1897)
Chiasmia fuscataria (Möschler, 1887)
Chiasmia geminilinea (Prout, 1932)
Chiasmia getula (Wallengren, 1872)
Chiasmia grandis Krüger, 2001
Chiasmia grimmia (Wallengren, 1872)
Chiasmia grisescens (Prout, 1916)
Chiasmia gueyei Sircoulomb, 2009
Chiasmia gyliura (Prout, 1932)
Chiasmia herbuloti (Viette, 1973)
Chiasmia hunyani Krüger, 2001
Chiasmia hypactinia (Prout, 1916)
Chiasmia imitatrix Krüger, 2001
Chiasmia impar (Warren, 1897)
Chiasmia improcera (Herbulot, 1987)
Chiasmia inaequilinea (Warren, 1911)
Chiasmia inconspicua (Warren, 1897)
Chiasmia infabricata (Prout, 1934)
Chiasmia inouei (Herbulot, 1987)
Chiasmia inquinata Krüger, 2001
Chiasmia insulicola Krüger, 2001
Chiasmia interrupta (Warren, 1897)
Chiasmia iringa Krüger, 2001
Chiasmia johnstoni (Butler, 1893)
Chiasmia kenyae Krüger, 2001
Chiasmia kilifi Krüger, 2001
Chiasmia kilimanjarensis (Holland, 1892)
Chiasmia kirbyi (Wallengren, 1875)
Chiasmia latimarginaria (Rebel, 1907)
Chiasmia lindemannae (D. S. Fletcher, 1958)
Chiasmia livorosa (Herbulot, 1964)
Chiasmia maculosa (Warren, 1899)
Chiasmia majestica (Warren, 1901)
Chiasmia malefidaria (Mabille, 1880)
Chiasmia malgassofusca Krüger, 2001
Chiasmia marmorata (Warren, 1897)
Chiasmia maronga Krüger, 2001
Chiasmia megalesia (Viette, 1975)
Chiasmia melsetter Krüger, 2001
Chiasmia monopepla (Prout, 1934)
Chiasmia monticolaria (Leech, 1897)
Chiasmia morogoro Krüger, 2001
Chiasmia multistrigata (Warren, 1897)
Chiasmia murina Krüger, 2001
Chiasmia nana (Warren, 1898)
Chiasmia natalensis (Warren, 1904)
Chiasmia neolivoros a Krüger, 2001
Chiasmia nevilledukei Krüger, 2001
Chiasmia ngami Krüger, 2001
Chiasmia nobilitata (Prout, 1913)
Chiasmia normata (Walker, 1861)
Chiasmia nubilata (Warren, 1897)
Chiasmia obliquilineata (Warren, 1899)
Chiasmia observata (Walker, 1861)
Chiasmia olindaria (Swinhoe, 1904)
Chiasmia orientalis Krüger, 2001
Chiasmia orthostates (Prout, 1915)
Chiasmia ostentosaria (Möschler, 1887)
Chiasmia parallacta (Warren, 1897)
Chiasmia parastreniata Krüger, 2001
Chiasmia paucimacula Krüger, 2001
Chiasmia percnoptera (Prout, 1915)
Chiasmia peremarginata Krüger, 2001
Chiasmia pervittata (Hampson, 1909)
Chiasmia phaeostigma (D. S. Fletcher, 1958)
Chiasmia pinheyi Krüger, 2001
Chiasmia plutocrypsis (Herbulot, 1987)
Chiasmia procidata (Guenée, 1858)
Chiasmia puerilis (Prout, 1916)
Chiasmia punctilinea (Prout, 1917)
Chiasmia rectilinea (Warren, 1905)
Chiasmia rectistriaria (Herrich-Schäffer, 1854)
Chiasmia rhabdophora (Holland, 1892)
Chiasmia sangueresara Krüger, 2001
Chiasmia sareptanaria (Staudinger, 1871)
Chiasmia semialbida (Prout, 1915)
Chiasmia semicolor (Warren, 1899)
Chiasmia semiolivacea Krüger, 2001
Chiasmia semitecta (Walker, 1861)
Chiasmia senegambiensis Krüger, 2001
Chiasmia separata (Druce, 1883)
Chiasmia simplex Krüger, 2001
Chiasmia simplicilinea (Warren, 1905)
Chiasmia somalica Krüger, 2001
Chiasmia sordidula (Bastelberger, 1909)
Chiasmia soror Krüger, 2001
Chiasmia sororcula (Warren, 1897)
Chiasmia streniata (Guenée, 1858)
Chiasmia subcretata (Warren, 1905)
Chiasmia subcurvaria (Mabille, 1897)
Chiasmia subcurvaria (Mabille, 1897)
Chiasmia subvaria (Bastelberger, 1907)
Chiasmia sudanata (Warren & Rothschild, 1905)
Chiasmia sufflata (Guenée, 1858)
Chiasmia suriens (Strand, 1912)
Chiasmia syriacaria (Staudinger, 1871)
Chiasmia tecnium (Prout, 1916)
Chiasmia tetragraphicata (Saalmüller, 1880)
Chiasmia threnopis (D. S. Fletcher, 1963)
Chiasmia trigonoleuca (Herbulot, 1987)
Chiasmia trinotata (Warren, 1902)
Chiasmia trinotatula Krüger, 2001
Chiasmia trirecurvata (Saalmüller, 1891)
Chiasmia tristis Krüger, 2001
Chiasmia trizonaria (Hampson, 1909)
Chiasmia tsaratanana (Viette, 1980)
Chiasmia turbulentata (Guenée, 1858)
Chiasmia umbrata (Warren, 1897)
Chiasmia umbratilis (Butler, 1875)
Chiasmia unifilata (Warren, 1899)
Chiasmia uniformis Krüger, 2001
Chiasmia unigeminata (Prout, 1923)
Chiasmia vau (Prout, 1913)
Chiasmia velia Agassiz, 2009
Chiasmia warreni (Prout, 1915)
Chiasmia zelota Prout, 1922
Chiasmia zobrysi Krüger, 2001

References

External links

Macariini